The State Crown of George I is the imperial and state crown crafted in 1714 for King George I. It was modified and used by subsequent monarchs until 1838. The empty gold frame and its aquamarine monde which dates from the reign of King James II are both part of the Crown Jewels of the United Kingdom. They are on public display in the Martin Tower at the Tower of London.

Origin
The crown, made by royal jeweller Samuel Smithin, replaced the state crown of Charles II (also used by his successors, James II, William III and Queen Anne) and incorporated some of the jewels and pearls from the old crown, with the addition of 265 new pearls, 160 diamonds, 6 emeralds and 2 sapphires, at a total cost of £1,440. Very little change was made to either the shape of the crown or the arrangement of the stones.

Watercolour

The crown is vibrantly depicted in a watercolour painting by Bernard Lens III, the miniature painter to the court of George II, dated 1731. This date suggests that Lens had made a sketch of the crown before it was entirely reset in 1727 for George II but did not finish it until some time afterwards. The inscription reads:

The crown with which George I, King of Great Britain, was crowned on 20 October 1714. The cap is of crimson velvet or purple; welt of ermine; circle and arches of beaten gold. The ornaments are silver and set with diamonds; the larger stones are sapphires and emeralds, and a few small rubies. The balas in the cross in front was given to the crown by James II. The ball on which the upper cross is fixed is an aquamarine but the lower part is gold enamelled green. It is worn when the king goes to parliament, is made new for every coronation, and kept at the Tower of London.

The "balas" mentioned here is the Black Prince's Ruby, a large spinel that was actually in the state crown of Charles II, and is first mentioned in Tudor inventories as being set in a crown used by Henry VIII. The "aquamarine" dates from 1685, when it replaced the original monde in the state crown of Charles II, and was later found to be paste or coloured glass.

Subsequent use and fate
George I's state crown was subsequently used at the coronations of George II, for whom the arches were pulled upwards, and George III. In 1821, because it was seen as being a "very poor affair", the crown underwent extensive changes, including the replacement of the rhombus-shaped monde with a globe of diamonds. Although the crown was present at the coronation of George IV, he was crowned using a new coronation crown made especially for him. William IV was the last monarch ever to use the crown. For her coronation in 1838, Queen Victoria had a new Imperial State Crown made, using precious stones from George I's state crown.

Emptied of its jewels and discarded by the royal family, the 1714 crown was loaned to the Museum of London by the Amherst family from 1933 until 1985. It was purchased by Asprey in 1987 and later acquired by Jefri Bolkiah, Prince of Brunei, who presented it to the United Kingdom. It had been valued at £576,000 in 1995 for the purposes of an application to export the crown to the United States. The application was withdrawn during a review by the Reviewing Committee on the Export of Works of Art. It is part of the Royal Collection and has been on public display in the Martin Tower at the Tower of London since 1996.

References

External links

1714 works
Crown Jewels of the United Kingdom
George I
George I of Great Britain